Idol 2016 is the twelfth season of the Swedish Idol series. This is the first year with a new jury consisting of Fredrik Kempe, Nikki Amini and Quincy Delight Jones III. Presenter of the show is as previous Pär Lernström. The show is broadcast on TV4.

Elimination chart 

1 All four acts Liam, Charlie, Oskar and Rebecka were declared Safe and progressed to the Semi Final

References

Idol (Swedish TV series)
2016 in Swedish music
2016 Swedish television seasons